Nasri Tony Atweh (born 10 January 1981), known mononymously as Nasri, is a Canadian singer, songwriter, and record producer. He currently resides in Los Angeles, California, United States. He is the lead vocalist and songwriter for the reggae fusion band, Magic!, a group consisting of fellow Toronto natives, Mark Pellizzer, Alex Tanas, and Ben Spivak. MAGIC!'s single "Rude" became a major international hit single. He is currently managed by Wassim "Sal" Slaiby.

Nasri is also a renowned songwriter and producer, one half of the songwriting and production duo the Messengers. He and Adam Messinger have produced a string of hits for well-known artists, including Justin Bieber, Shakira, Pitbull, Chris Brown, Halsey, and more. In 2012, he earned the Grammy Award for Best R&B Album for his production work on Chris Brown's F.A.M.E.. He also received a Latin Grammy for Best Pop Vocal Album and the Grammy Award for Best Latin Pop Album for his work on Shakira's El Dorado. His songs "As Long as You Love Me" by Justin Bieber and "Feel This Moment" by Pitbull both made the top 10 of the Billboard Hot 100.

Early life and education
Nasri was born and raised in Toronto as a child of Palestinian Christian immigrants from Bethlehem. and began singing at the age of six. He studied at Senator O'Connor College School, and while attending, was part of the school choir as well as extra-curricular sports.

Career

Early career as a solo artist
At age 19, Atweh presented a demo to a local radio station. He then earned a deal with Universal Canada. Two years later in 2002, he won the John Lennon Songwriting Contest with a song he wrote with Adam Messinger. The following year, he released two solo singles through Universal, "Go" and "Ova N' Dun With"․

The songs received some airplay in Canada, and another song titled "Best Friend" was also heard on indie radio in his hometown in 2003. According to the promotional material attached to his single "Go", he was to release an album titled Invisible Walls sometime in 2003 or 2004, but that never materialized. In 2007, he released a song entitled "Click, Click, Click", that would ultimately be covered by the New Kids on the Block.

Writing and production with the Messengers
Nasri is part of the writing and production duo the Messengers alongside Adam Messinger. He helped drive the reunion of the New Kids on the Block in 2007, and wrote numerous songs for them including his first, "Summertime". Over the course of the following years, Nasri wrote (usually with Messinger) for other major label artists such as Justin Bieber, David Guetta, Shakira, Cody Simpson, Cheryl, Boyzone, JLS, Kat Deluna, Elliott Yamin, Jason Derulo, Akon, Pitbull, Christina Aguilera, Chris Brown, Lana Del Rey, Big Time Rush, Iggy Azalea, Michael Bolton, Peter Andre, JoJo, Jay Sean, Vanessa Hudgens, No Angels, Manafest, and Iyaz.

The Messengers are a Grammy-winning production team. Their work has resulted in two Grammy Award nominations for 2011 Best Pop Vocal Album for Justin Bieber (My World 2.0), 2011 Best Contemporary R&B Album for Chris Brown (Graffiti), and a win for 2012 Best R&B Album for Chris Brown (F.A.M.E.), as well as their collaboration with Justin Bieber / Rascal Flatts in "That Should Be Me" that won a 2011 CMT Music Award for Best Collaborative Video. In 2017 and 2018, he was honored with the Latin Grammy Award for Best Pop Vocal Album and the Grammy Award for Best Latin Pop Album for his work on Shakira's El Dorado.

Success with Magic!
While playing music with friend Mark Pellizzer (who played guitar for Justin Nozuka) in 2012, Nasri conceived of Magic!. Mark Pellizzer then recruited Alex Tanas on drums and Ben Spivak on bass. In 2013, Magic! released their highly successful debut single, "Rude", which peaked at number six on the Canadian Hot 100, topped the charts in the United States and the United Kingdom, and peaked within the top ten of the charts in Australia, New Zealand, Denmark, the Netherlands and Sweden. The band is signed to Sony Music Entertainment and partnered with Latium Entertainment in addition to RCA Records in the USA.

Their debut album, Don't Kill the Magic, was released in 2014 and charted at number 5 in Canada and at number 6 in the U.S. Their follow-up, Primary Colours, was released in 2016 and third album Expectations in 2018.

Personal life
Since 2009, he has been linked romantically with the German singer Sandy Mölling. The two had met while working on the No Angels album Welcome to the Dance. He has a son called Noah with Mölling.

Discography

As solo artist
Singles

"Go" (2003)
"Ova N' Dun With" (2003)
"Click Click Click" (2007)
"You Deserve Better" (2012)

along with many other unreleased demos

As member of Magic!

Songwriting and production

References

External links

 MAGIC! official website (archived)
 Nasri official MySpace

1981 births
Living people
Palestinian songwriters
Palestinian record producers
Palestinian pop singers
Canadian singer-songwriters
Canadian record producers
Canadian pop singers
Musicians from Toronto
Canadian people of Palestinian descent
Canadian rhythm and blues musicians
21st-century Canadian male singers
Canadian male singer-songwriters